The 2014 Indian general election polls in Uttar Pradesh for 80 Lok Sabha seats was held in six phases on 10, 17, 24, 30 April and 7, 12 May 2014. The total voter strength of Uttar Pradesh was 134,351,297.

The main political parties in Uttar Pradesh are Bahujan Samaj Party (BSP), Bharatiya Janata Party (BJP), Indian National Congress (INC) and Samajwadi party (SP). BJP allied with Apna Dal and INC allied with Rashtriya Lok Dal and Mahan Dal.

Opinion polling

Election schedule

Constituency wise Election schedule are given below-

Results
The BJP won 71 seats, a monumental increase from the 10 seats it won in LS 2009 elections. Bahujan Samaj Party (BSP) which formed government in UP for four times did not win a single seat in this general elections. For the first time in the history of Independent India, Uttar Pradesh did not send a single Muslim to the Lok Sabha.
{| style="width:88%; text-align:center;"
|+ 
|- style="color:white;"
| style="background:orange; width:88.75%;" | 71
| style="background:blue; width:2.5%;" | 2
| style="background:red; width:6.25%;" | 5
| style="background:aqua; width:2.5%;" | 2
|-
| BJP
| Apna Dal
| SP
| <span style="color:aqua;">''INC</span>
|}
 

Constituency Wise ResultsKeys:  '''

Region-wise Results

References

Uttar Pradesh
Indian general elections in Uttar Pradesh
April 2014 events in India
May 2014 events in India